Jose Luis Cardoso Lobo (born 2 February 1975 in Seville, Spain) is a Grand Prix motorcycle road racer. During the 2006 season, he rode for the Pramac d'Antin Ducati squad, his second time with this team.

Early career
His first success was victory in the 1990 Andalucian 125cc championship, before moving up to the national championship a year later. In 1993 he won the Spanish 125cc title, as well as the Andalucian 250cc series, and made his 125cc World Championship debut in his home round. He combined world and Spanish 250cc racing over the next two seasons, finishing as runner-up in his domestic series in 1995.

Cardoso concentrated on international racing for the first time in 1996, but did not match his 16th overall in the world series over the next two seasons. He doubled up successfully in 1998, winning the Spanish 250cc title and finishing 11th in the international level.

500cc and MotoGP part 1
This was enough to earn him a 500cc World Championship ride with the TSR Honda team in 1999, finishing 25th overall. In 2000 his team had sponsorship from Maxon Dee Cee Jeans, and he finished 18th overall. 2001 was his first year with Luis D'Antin's team, and he racked up 45 points, more than double his 2000 total, although it was only good for 16th overall. The championship became MotoGP in 2002, although he only made 5 appearances, and did not race anything in 2003.

Recent years
In 2004 Cardoso won the Spanish Formula Extreme title, and in 2005, he moved to Superbike World Championship, with the DFXtreme Yamaha team. He was highly competitive in testing, but struggled to finish races, ultimately coming only 31st overall. However, he went back to MotoGP and D'Antin in 2006, racing a 2005-spec Ducati as teammate to German Alex Hofmann. With the WCM team absent, and Team Roberts powered by Honda engines, they and Tech 3 Yamaha are the only privateer teams on the grid, and Cardoso and Hofmann have usually only had Tech 3's James Ellison near them at the bottom of the timesheets.

Career statistics

Grand Prix motorcycle racing

By class

Races by year
(key)

Superbike World Championship

Races by year
(key)

References

External links

 Crash.net profile

1975 births
Living people
Sportspeople from Seville
Pramac Racing MotoGP riders
Superbike World Championship riders
Spanish motorcycle racers
500cc World Championship riders
250cc World Championship riders
MotoGP World Championship riders